The Alburnett Community School District is a rural public school district headquartered in Alburnett, Iowa.

The district is completely within Linn County, and serves Alburnett, Hiawatha and the surrounding rural areas.

Schools
The district operates three schools in one facility in Alburnett:
 Alburnett Elementary School
 Alburnett Middle School
 Alburnett High School

See also
List of school districts in Iowa

References

External links
 Alburnett Community School District

School districts in Iowa
Education in Linn County, Iowa